Nimrod Snoddy (July 4, 1821 - May 16, 1886) was an A. M. E. preacher who served in the Alabama Legislature during the Reconstruction era. He was elected to the Alabama House of Representatives in 1876 representing Greene County, Alabama. He held substantial property in 1870 and was living in Greene County, Alabama.

He was African American and was active in the A. M. E. Church in Clinton, Alabama and as an elder preacher later in life.

See also
List of African American officeholders during Reconstruction

References

19th-century American politicians
African-American politicians during the Reconstruction Era
African Methodist Episcopal Church clergy
African-American state legislators in Alabama
People from Greene County, Alabama
1821 births
1886 deaths
19th-century American clergy